James Chapman may refer to:

J. A. Chapman (1821–1885), three-term mayor of Portland, Oregon
James Chapman (explorer) (1831–1872), South African explorer, hunter, trader and photographer
James Chapman (Australian politician) (1855–1925), Tasmanian politician
James Chapman (bishop) (died 1879), Anglican Bishop of Colombo
James A. Chapman (1881–1966), Oklahoma oil magnate and philanthropist
James Chapman (footballer) (1932–1993), Australian rules footballer for Fitzroy
Ben Chapman (politician) (James Keith Chapman, born 1940), British Labour Party Member of Parliament 1997–2010
James Chapman (author) (born 1955), American novelist
James Chapman (media historian) (born 1968), British media historian
James Chapman (rower) (born 1979), Australian rower
James Chapman (cricketer) (born 1986), English cricketer
James Chapman (fl. 2006–2019), English musician, known professionally as Maps

See also 
Jim Chapman (disambiguation)